Dracaenura torridalis is a species of moth of the family Crambidae. It was described by George Hamilton Kenrick in 1907 and it is found in Papua New Guinea.

It has a wingspan of 33 mm.

References

External links
Boldsystems.org: images of this species

Moths described in 1907
Spilomelinae